Rhipidoglossum is a genus of flowering plants from the orchid family, Orchidaceae. It contains about 20-30 species, all from sub-Saharan Africa.

Species 
This genus contains the following species:

Rhipidoglossum arbonnieri - Grows in epiphyte forests near waterfalls
Rhipidoglossum caffrum
Rhipidoglossum clavatum - lives in Montane ecosystems
Rhipidoglossum globularis - Native to Tanzania
Rhipidoglossum montealenense - Native to costal southwest Guinea
Rhipidoglossum millarii - Grows in costal forests on twigs
Rhipidoglossum leedalii - native to Kenya and Tanzania in Eastern Africa
Rhipidoglossum pareense - Native to the Pare Mountains of Tanzania
Rhipidoglossum pusilla - A plant dwarf with a stem of 
Rhipidoglossum rutilum - Native to tropical Africa
Rhipidoglossum xanthopollinia

See also 
 List of Orchidaceae genera

References

External links 
IOSPE orchid photos, Rhipidoglossum rutilum (Rchb. f.) Schltr. 1918 Photo courtesy of © Lourens Grobler
African Orchids, Rhipidoglossum (very detailed description)
Swiss Orchid Foundation at the Herbarium Jany Renz, Rhipidoglossum rutilum (Rchb. f.) Schltr.
 
 }

Vandeae genera
Angraecinae